Cortie is a surname. Notable people with the surname include: 

 Aloysius Cortie (1859–1925), English astronomer
 Yannick Cortie (born 1993), Dutch footballer